Marata Niukore (born 29 July 1996) is a professional rugby league footballer who plays as a  and  for the New Zealand Warriors in the NRL. He has played for both the Cook Islands and New Zealand at international level.

He previously played for the Parramatta Eels in the National Rugby League.

Background
Niukore was born in Auckland, New Zealand.

Career

2018
He started his career with the New Zealand Warriors Under 20s before being signed by the Parramatta Eels until the end of 2018 and playing for Wentworthville Magpies in the NSW Cup. Niukore made a total of 40 appearances for Wentworthville over 2 seasons. He represented the Cook Islands against Papua New Guinea in 2017.

In round 11 of the 2018 NRL season, Niukore made his NRL debut for Parramatta against the New Zealand Warriors.

Niukore ended the 2018 NRL season for Parramatta with 14 appearances for the club.

2019
In round 1 of the 2019 NRL season, Niukore started at second-row for Parramatta scoring his first NRL try against the Penrith Panthers in a 20–12 win.

On November 4 2019, it was announced that Niukore had signed a three-year deal to remain at Parramatta until the end of the 2022 season.

2020
He made a total of 17 appearances for Parramatta in the 2020 NRL season as the club finished third but were eliminated from the finals in straight sets.

2021
At the start of the 2021 NRL season, Niukore replaced the injured Waqa Blake at centre.  In round 9 of the 2021 NRL season, he was placed on report for a high tackle on Sydney Roosters player James Tedesco and was later suspended for two matches.

In round 22, Niukore was sent to the sin bin during Parramatta's 56–10 loss against Manly.
Niukore made a total of 21 games for Parramatta and played in both of the club's finals matches against Newcastle and Penrith.  Parramatta were eliminated by Penrith at the semi-final stage in a tough 8–6 loss.

On 11 November, Niukore signed with the New Zealand Warriors on a four-year $2.6 million starting in 2023, until the end of 2026.

2022
In the second week of the 2022 finals series, Niukore scored two tries for Parramatta in a 40-4 victory over Canberra.
Niukore played 19 games for Parramatta in the 2022 NRL season including the club's Grand Final loss to Penrith.

References

External links

Parramatta Eels profile

1996 births
Living people
Cook Islands national rugby league team players
New Zealand rugby league players
New Zealand national rugby league team players
New Zealand sportspeople of Cook Island descent
Parramatta Eels players
New Zealand Warriors players
Wentworthville Magpies players
Rugby league players from Auckland
Rugby league second-rows